Josh Hill (born 19 January 1989) is a former professional Australian rules footballer who played for the Western Bulldogs and West Coast Eagles in the Australian Football League (AFL).

Career
Originally from Broome in the Kimberley region of Western Australia, Hill moved to Perth, where he attended Trinity College.

He was drafted by the Western Bulldogs with selection 61 in the 2006 National Draft, and made his AFL debut in round 17 of the 2007 season against the West Coast Eagles. In round two, 2008, Hill was named the Rising Star nominee. In 2009, Hill played 23 games, kicking 33 goals as a half-forward flanker and forward pocket. Hill struggled for form in 2010 and 2011, playing 24 games between the two seasons, and kicking 26 goals.

Hill was traded to the West Coast Eagles in October 2011 in exchange for the 49th pick overall in the 2011 National Draft. He made his debut for West Coast in round one of the 2012 season, scoring three goals. Hill again kicked three goals in the second round of the season, against .

Hill was delisted by West Coast at the conclusion of the 2017 season.

Personal life
Hill is the second cousin of Fremantle's Stephen and Bradley Hill. On August 8, 2020, Hill welcomed his first child with his fiance Jo Duffy. On August 13, 2020, he welcomed his second child with his former girlfriend Kara Wicks. He confirmed that he is indeed the father of both children and vows to honour his responsibilities to both children. In November 2021, Hill and Duffy married in a small private ceremony.

References

External links

1989 births
Australian rules footballers from Western Australia
Indigenous Australian players of Australian rules football
Living people
People educated at Trinity College, Perth
People from Broome, Western Australia
West Coast Eagles players
Western Bulldogs players
East Perth Football Club players
Preston Football Club (VFA) players
Australia international rules football team players